WKAR-TV (channel 23) is a PBS member television station licensed to East Lansing, Michigan, United States, serving the Central Lower Peninsula of Michigan. The station is owned by Michigan State University and operated as part of its Broadcasting Services Division. WKAR-TV's studios are located in the Communication Arts and Sciences Building, at the southeast corner of Wilson and Red Cedar Roads on the MSU campus in East Lansing. Its transmitter is located on Kinawa Road in Meridian Township, Michigan between East Lansing and Williamston.

History
WKAR-TV went on the air in January 1954, broadcasting on channel 60. It took its call letters from WKAR radio (which first went on the air in 1922 with the call letters being assigned randomly, and do not reflect Michigan's automotive heritage or the university's early agricultural roots). It is the second-oldest educational television station in the United States, and the oldest east of the Mississippi River. It was the third station on the air, but the second, in Los Angeles (KTHE), went dark not long after it began operations. KUHT in Houston is the oldest.

Despite MSU's long history in broadcasting, WKAR-TV struggled for viewers because television sets at that time were not required to have UHF tuning capability. Viewers needed an expensive converter to watch channel 60, and the picture was marginal at best even with one. With this in mind, MSU unsuccessfully tried to persuade the Federal Communications Commission (FCC) to re-designate channel 10, the only other VHF channel allocated to the Lansing area, for noncommercial use. Instead, the license went to Jackson Telecasters, a private company, which used it to start Lansing's NBC affiliate, WILX-TV.

Eventually, MSU made an arrangement with Jackson Telecasters to share channel 10 with WILX. So in 1959, WKAR-TV changed its call sign to WMSB (for Michigan State Broadcasting) and moved to channel 10. The two broadcasters maintained separate studios and offices, with WMSB continuing to air from a Quonset hut on the MSU campus while WILX operated from Jackson. However, they shared the same transmitting facilities in Onondaga. WMSB occupied channel 10 for 30 percent of the broadcast day, but WILX had the remainder, including all of prime time. WMSB would often cede its time to WILX in case of breaking news, or if NBC aired sports or special events during WMSB's allocated time.

In 1972, MSU resumed full-time broadcasting on channel 23 under its original call letters, WKAR-TV. This was made possible by the All Channels Act of 1961 (requiring all TV sets sold in the United States to receive UHF channels starting in 1964), the Public Broadcasting Act of 1967, and the subsequent development of PBS in 1969. The channel 23 dedication program was simulcast on both channels 10 (WMSB) and 23 (WKAR-TV), after which WMSB went silent and WILX began broadcasting on channel 10 full-time.

At approximately 3:36 p.m. on August 21, 1978, a fire broke out at WKAR's transmitter site, knocking the station off the air for the next two months and causing $900,000 (in 1978 dollars) in damage. WKAR-FM also went off the air at about 4 p.m. That station returned to the air by mid-September. While the transmitter was under repair, WJIM-TV (now WLNS) aired some of WKAR's programming, such as Sesame Street. The cause of the fire remains unknown.

In 1981, WKAR-TV moved from the Quonset hut it had occupied since the station began operating to the Communication Arts and Sciences Building. The Breslin Student Events Center occupies the former studio location today.

By November 14, 2003, MSU Broadcasting Services was cablecasting two community TV channels, KAR2 and KAR3. WKAR-DT began broadcasting on Channel 55 on January 15, 2004. By November 4, 2007, WKAR Life and World network, branded as WKAR World, were added to the digital and cable lineup as .3/KAR2 and .4/KAR3 respectively. On April 6, 2008 WKAR Life became WKAR Create.

WKAR-TV shut down its analog signal, over UHF channel 23, on January 13, 2009. The station's digital signal relocated from its pre-transition UHF channel 55, which was among the high band UHF channels (52-69) that were removed from broadcasting use as a result of the transition, to UHF channel 40, using PSIP to display WKAR-TV's virtual channel as 23 on digital television receivers.

On June 18, 2010, construction of a new broadcast tower for WKAR-TV and WKAR-FM was approved during a Michigan State University Board of Trustees meeting. The project was completed in August 2011. On September 10, 2012, WKAR-TV began transmission of its digital signal 24/7.

On January 11, 2016, WKAR announced that it would partner with WTVS in Detroit to launch a 24-hour children's television service to be carried by both stations. The station also confirmed that it will not participate in the FCC's spectrum incentive auction. On January 16, 2017, World was moved from the fourth subchannel to the second with PBS Kids replacing it on .4.

WKAR-TV announced on April 28, 2018 that it had filed an application with the FCC to launch a temporary ATSC 3.0 broadcast on UHF channel 35 for the purpose of getting to understand ATSC 3.0 better, and recognizing that it could only operate the channel until stage 3 of the repack (which begins on April 13, 2019; nearby broadcaster WAQP in Saginaw, Michigan would then be moving to UHF 36), at which point they would either apply to move the signal on UHF 35, or shut it down to prevent adjacent-channel interference to WAQP-TV. The broadcast began in September 2018.

Programming
WKAR has at times aired select programming for Michigan State University's student-produced television station MSU Telecasters.

WKAR-TV serves as the flagship station for Michigan Public Broadcasting (MPB) television programs. Programs distributed statewide on a weekly or monthly basis include QuizBusters, Off the Record, BackStage Pass as well as specials like the Governor of Michigan's annual "State of the State" address.

WKAR-TV also held a yearly phone-in auction spanning over several days, where viewers could bid on items which were donated by local businesses and volunteers. When it was first held in 1977, it was the first of its kind in mid-Michigan. In 2007, citing a poorer economy, and the fact that they can raise more money by putting their resources into other developmental activities, the fundraising event ceased at the conclusion of the 30th WKAR-TV Auction.

Subchannels
The station's digital signal is multiplexed:

WKAR-HD/23.1 broadcasts main PBS programs, with children's programming airing from 6:30 a.m. to noon, taking a break until 2 p.m., with the rest of PBS Kids running until 6 p.m. The channel also airs locally produced programs, along with programs from APT and other distributors.

WKAR World/23.2 broadcasts programs from the World network, along with encores of PBS programs.

WKAR Create/23.3 launched as WKAR Life as 2007; the name change occurring in 2008. The channel broadcasts programs from the Create network.

WKAR PBS Kids/23.4 broadcasts PBS Kids programs from 6 a.m. to 10 p.m., with the 2 p.m. to 10 p.m. schedule repeating until 6 a.m.

WKAR Michigan Learning Channel/23.5 is a statewide partnership of Michigan's public TV stations offering educational programming for students from pre-K to 12th grade.

References

External links

, WMSB history

Michigan State University
PBS member stations
Television channels and stations established in 1954
1954 establishments in Michigan
KAR-TV